Tiquilia canescens, the woody crinklemat or shrubby tiquilia, is a perennial, shrub in mid- to lower-elevation desert regions in the family Boraginaceae - Borage or the Forget-me-nots. It is found in the southwestern United States and Northwestern Mexico, in the states of California, Nevada, Arizona, Utah, New Mexico, Texas, Chihuahua, Sonora, and Baja California. It is a short, low-growing plant, seldom over 15 in tall.

It has pinkish to white, 5-lobed tubular flowers; leaves are ovate, gray green, and fleshy, to 1/2 - 3/4 in long.

See also
Calflora Database: Tiquilia canescens (Shrubby coldenia,  woody crinklemat)
Jepson eFlora (TJM2): Tiquilia canescens
Close-up Photo & T. canescens description - wc.pima.edu – "Desert Ecology of Tucson, Arizona"
Field photo: Tiquilia canescens; Article & species synopsis-leaves, flowers, etc. - gallery - naturesongs.com – "Shrubby Coldenia"—"Shrubs and Bushes of the Verde Valley & Sedona"
Tiquilia canescens photo gallery - CalPhotos

References

canescens
Flora of Arizona
Flora of the California desert regions
Flora of Baja California
Flora of Nevada
Flora of Utah
Flora of New Mexico
Flora of Texas
Flora of Sonora
Flora of Chihuahua (state)
Flora of the Chihuahuan Desert
Flora of the Sonoran Deserts
Natural history of the Colorado Desert
Natural history of the Mojave Desert
Least concern plants